Kevin O'Toole (born December 14, 1998) is an American professional soccer player who plays as a forward for Major League Soccer club New York City FC.

Career
O'Toole is a member of the New York Red Bulls Academy. During the 2015/16 season he appeared in 2 matches for the U-17/18 team. He also appeared for United Soccer League side New York Red Bulls II in 2016, signing on an amateur contract.

O'Toole made his debut for the New York Red Bulls II in the summer of 2016 at the age of 17. He scored his first professional goal on July 23 in a 3–2 loss to Charleston Battery. On October 23, 2016, O'Toole helped the club to a 5–1 victory over Swope Park Rangers in the 2016 USL Cup Final, appearing as a starter in the cup final.

O'Toole was selected by New York City FC with the 34th overall pick in the 2022 MLS SuperDraft. On March 7, 2022, O'Toole officially signed with New York City FC.

Career statistics

Honors
New York City FC
Campeones Cup: 2022

References

External links 
 
 ussoccerda.com profile

1998 births
Living people
American soccer players
New York Red Bulls II players
Association football defenders
People from Montclair, New Jersey
Soccer players from New Jersey
Sportspeople from Essex County, New Jersey
USL Championship players
USL League Two players
New York Red Bulls U-23 players
Princeton Tigers men's soccer players
New York City FC draft picks
New York City FC players
New York City FC II players
MLS Next Pro players
Major League Soccer players